is a Japanese, Osaka-based chemical company whose main products are automotive, industrial and decorative coatings.

The company is one of the world's top ten paint manufacturers with manufacturing sites in over 43 countries across the world.

Kansai Paint is a member of the Mitsubishi UFJ Financial Group (MUFJ) keiretsu.

Products
 Automotive coatings
 Automotive refinish coatings
 Industrial coatings
 Decorative coatings
 Protective coatings
 Marine coatings
 Coatings for personal use

Source

Sponsorship
In January 2013, the company signed a three-year sponsorship deal with the English football club Manchester United.

References

External links 
 

Japanese companies established in 1918
Chemical companies of Japan
Paint manufacturers
Manufacturing companies based in Osaka
Companies listed on the Tokyo Stock Exchange
Chemical companies established in 1918
Japanese brands
Sojitz
Midori-kai
Multinational companies headquartered in Japan